The  is a multi-purpose exhibition center in Tokyo, Japan. The complex is generally considered to be in the Yūrakuchō business district, being adjacent to Yūrakuchō Station, but it is administratively in the Marunouchi district.

Tokyo International Forum was built on the site of the Old City Hall, the former government headquarters which was relocated to the Tokyo Metropolitan Government Building in Nishi-Shinjuku.

Background
One of its halls seats 5,000. In addition to seven other halls, it includes exhibition space, a lobby, restaurants, shops, and other facilities.

Designed by architect Rafael Viñoly and completed in 1996, it features swooping curves of steel truss and glass; the outside is shaped like an elongated boat.

Standing between Tokyo Station and Yūrakuchō Station, its address is in Marunouchi, Chiyoda, on the site formerly occupied by Tokyo City Hall (before it moved to the Tokyo Metropolitan Government Building in 1991).

On the first floor, facing in the direction of Edo Castle (now the Imperial Palace), is a bronze sculpture of Ōta Dōkan.

Selected events 
 7 December 1999: Draw for the preliminary competition of the 2002 FIFA World Cup in Korea and Japan
 2005: La Folle Journée au Japon
2007: Muse: Black Holes and Revelations Tour (MuseWiki)
 2008: BoA Live Tour 2008 -The Face-
 2011: International Union of Architects world congress
 2012: World Bank and IMF Annual Meetings
 2014: International Bar Association congress
 2015: Ariana Grande, The Honeymoon Tour
 2016: Selena Gomez, Revival Tour
 2016: Michael Schenker, as part of a show called "Michael Schenker Fest," which saw the guitarist reunited on stage with all 3 singers he worked with during the 1980s (Gary Barden, Graham Bonnet, and Robin McAuley), as well as several musicians from the same era, as well. A CD/DVD of the concert was issued a year later, Michael Schenker Fest "Live" Tokyo.
 2017: Park Bo-gum, "Oh Happy Day": 2016-2017 Asia Fan Meeting Tour
 2017: Shawn Mendes, Illuminate World Tour
 21 December 2019: Teppen World Championship 2019 finals
 2021: Weightlifting venue for the 2020 Summer Olympics
 2021: Powerlifting venue for the 2020 Summer Paralympics
 2021: Kōhaku Uta Gassen television special
 13 March 2022: Hiroyuki Sawano's solo live "Hiroyuki Sawano LIVE [nZk]007"

Gallery

References

External links

Tokyo International Forum
Tokyo International Forum Map
Tokyo International Forum at greatbuildings.com

Marunouchi
Buildings and structures in Chiyoda, Tokyo
Convention centers in Japan
Concert halls in Japan
Music venues in Tokyo
Venues of the 2020 Summer Olympics
Olympic weightlifting venues
Rafael Viñoly buildings
Event venues established in 1997
1997 establishments in Japan